Jack Fairweather may refer to:

 Jack Fairweather (politician) (1878–1948), lawyer and political figure in New Brunswick, Canada
 Jack Fairweather (writer) (born 1978), British journalist and author